Raymond B. Rosenthal (December 19, 1914 – July 24, 1995) was an American translator of Italian literature into the English language.

He has translated the works of Primo Levi, Pietro Aretino, Aldo Busi, Piero Sanavio, Gabriele D'Annunzio, Pietro Citati, Giovanni Verga, and Pietro Redondi, among others.

References

1914 births
1995 deaths
Italian–English translators
20th-century American translators